Carlisle is a given name related to Carlyle It may refer to the following notable people:

Carlisle Adams, Canadian cryptographer and computer security researcher
Carlisle Best (born 1959), Barbadian former cricketer
 Carlisle Cullen, fictional character in The Twilight Series by Stephenie Meyer
 Carlisle Floyd (1926–2021), American composer
Carlisle Graham (1850 – 1909), American athlete
Carlisle W. Higgins (1889–1980), American jurist
Carlisle H. Humelsine (1915 – 1989), American diplomat and military office
Carlisle Jarvis (1906 – 1979), Australian rules footballer
Carlisle Moody (born 1943), American economist, criminologist, and professor
Carlisle Perry (1893 – 1953), American baseball player
 Carlisle Runge (1920–1983), American lawyer and diplomat
 Carlisle Trost (1930–2020), American navy officer

See also

Carlile (given name)
Carlisle (surname)
Carlyle (name)

English masculine given names